

Johann-Georg Richert (14 April 1890 – 30 January 1946) was a German general during World War II. He commanded the 286th Security Division whose personnel committed numerous war crimes in occupied Belarus, in the Army Group Center Rear Area.

The 35th Infantry Division also committed war crimes during early 1944 while Richert was its commanding officer. The division's operations against "partisans" (who were often civilians) became more frequent and brutal after Richert assumed command. Richert also ordered that all of his soldiers who were in hospitals without injuries or a diagnosed illness be executed, and threatened units and commanding officers who were defeated in battle with severe penalties.

With the help of troops from Sonderkommando 7b of Einsatzgruppe B, Richert forced at least 40,000 civilians into the Ozarichi death camps, makeshift camps which had been established by Josef Harpe. Dieter Pohl has called the establishment of the camp "one of the worst crimes the Wehrmacht ever committed against civilians". By the time troops of the 65th Army of the First Belorussian Front liberated those in camps on 19 March 1944, at least 9000 people had died. The troops freed 33,480 people, including 15,960 children under the age of 13, from the Ozarichi deaths camps.

Richert was taken prisoner by Soviet troops on 8 May 1945. In 1946, he was put on trial by a Soviet military court in Minsk for his role in the deportations, as well as other crimes against Soviet civilians. Richert was sentenced to death, and publicly hanged the next morning in Minsk on 30 January 1946. Richert was hanged with 13 of his codefendants with over 100,000 people watching.

Awards and decorations
 Clasp to the Iron Cross (1939) 2nd Class (20 September 1939) & 1st Class (3 October 1939)
 German Cross in Gold on 1 December 1941 as oberst in 23rd Infantry Regiment
 Knight's Cross of the Iron Cross with Oak Leaves
 Knight's Cross on 17 March 1944 as generalleutnant and commander of 35th Infantry Division
 Oak Leaves on 18 October 1944 as generalleutnant and commander of 35th Infantry Division

References

Citations

Bibliography

Further reading 

1890 births
1946 deaths
Holocaust perpetrators in Belarus
Lieutenant generals of the German Army (Wehrmacht)
Recipients of the Gold German Cross
Recipients of the Knight's Cross of the Iron Cross with Oak Leaves
German people convicted of war crimes
Nazis executed by the Soviet Union by hanging
People executed for war crimes
Executed mass murderers
People from Lubawka
German Army generals of World War II
German Army personnel of World War I